Michael J. Coppola (December 7, 1942 in Boston, Massachusetts – August 26, 2005 in Attleboro, Massachusetts) was an American politician who represented the 1st Bristol District in the Massachusetts House of Representatives from 2001 to 2005. He had previously served as a member of the Foxborough, Massachusetts, Board of Selectmen from 1989 to 2001.
 
Coppola died on August 26, 2005, from colon cancer. He was succeeded as State Representative by his widow, Ginny Coppola.

References

1942 births
2005 deaths
Deaths from cancer in Massachusetts
Deaths from colorectal cancer
Republican Party members of the Massachusetts House of Representatives
People from Bristol County, Massachusetts
People from Foxborough, Massachusetts
20th-century American politicians